Fuping County is a county located in the center of Shaanxi Province, China. It is the westernmost county-level division of the prefecture-level city of Weinan.

Its postal code is 711700. It comprises 24 towns, 337 administrative villages.

Xi Jinping, the General Secretary of the Chinese Communist Party, traces his ancestry here. His father, former Vice-Premier Xi Zhongxun was from here.

Administrative divisions
As 2019, Fuping County is divided to 1 subdistrict and 14 towns.
Subdistricts
 Chengguan Subdistrict

Towns

Climate

References

External links
Official website of Fuping County government

County-level divisions of Shaanxi